Federico Gamboa was a Mexican hurdler. He competed in the men's 110 metres hurdles at the 1932 Summer Olympics.

References

Year of birth missing
Year of death missing
Athletes (track and field) at the 1932 Summer Olympics
Mexican male hurdlers
Olympic athletes of Mexico
Place of birth missing